Tomasso Sandrino (1575–1631) (also Sandrini) was an Italian painter of quadratura in Northern Italy, active in his native Brescia.

Among the church ceilings he helped fresco with quadrature are Sant Faustino, San Domenico, Chiesa del Carmine, and the Cathedral of Brescia.  He also worked in Milan, Ferrara, and Mirandola.

Life and works
Sandrini was active in quadratura and in architecture.  In 1615, he helped decorate the church of San Domenico in Brescia.  His brother Pietro worked with Ottavio Viviani in painting the ceiling of Santa Caterina.  Among his pupils was Domenico Bruni.  

Sandrini painted frescoes for the church of Santi Faustino e Giovita in Brescia.  Sandrini painted the ceiling of the church of the Carmini.  He was active in painting the cupola of Madonna della Ghiara and the church of San Giovanni in Reggio Emilia; as well as a church in Mirandola.  Sandrini died in the town of Palazzolo sull'Oglio.

References

Further reading

1575 births
1630s deaths
16th-century Italian painters
Italian male painters
17th-century Italian painters
Italian Renaissance painters
Quadratura painters
Painters from Brescia
Fresco painters